Windsor and Maidenhead Borough Council is the local authority of the Royal Borough of Windsor and Maidenhead in Berkshire, England. It is a unitary authority, having the powers of a non-metropolitan county and district council combined. Windsor and Maidenhead is divided into 19 wards, electing 41 councillors. The council was created by the Local Government Act 1972 and replaced six local authorities: Cookham Rural District Council, Eton Urban District Council, Eton Rural District Council, Maidenhead Borough Council, New Windsor Borough Council and Windsor Rural District Council. Since 1 April 1998 it has been a unitary authority, assuming the powers and functions of Berkshire County Council.

History
The authority was formed as the Windsor and Maidenhead District Council. It replaced Cookham Rural District Council, Eton Urban District Council, Eton Rural District Council, Maidenhead Borough Council, New Windsor Borough Council and Windsor Rural District Council. The current local authority was first elected in 1973, a year before formally coming into its powers and prior to the creation of the Royal Borough of Windsor and Maidenhead on 1 April 1974. The council gained borough status, entitling it to be known as Windsor and Maidenhead Borough Council.

It was envisaged through the Local Government Act 1972 that Windsor and Maidenhead as a non-metropolitan district council would deliver district-level services, with the Berkshire County Council providing county-level services. This arrangement lasted until 1998 when Berkshire County Council was abolished and Windsor and Maidenhead Borough Council gained responsibility for services that had been provided by the county council.

Political control

Since 1973 political control of the council has been held by the following parties:

Premises
The council is based at Maidenhead Town Hall, on St Ives Road in Maidenhead, which had been built in 1962 for the former Maidenhead Borough Council.

References

Leader and cabinet executives
Unitary authority councils of England
Royal Borough of Windsor and Maidenhead
Local education authorities in England
Local authorities in Berkshire
Billing authorities in England